John Stith (fl. 1631–1694) was a member of the Virginia House of Burgesses and the progenitor of the Stith family, one of the first families of Virginia.

Early life
John Stith was born in Kirkham in Lancashire, England in 1625. Stith ancestors were likely from the Kirkham area.

Colonial America
Stith, the first person in colony of Virginia with that surname, received a land grant in 1652 with Samuel Eale for 500 acres in Charles City County, Virginia, where he settled. He also received 500 acres of land in 1663. 

He was a merchant, an attorney, and a justice of the peace, and served in the militia as a lieutenant (1656), a captain (1676), and a major (1680).   In 1676, he participated with Nathaniel Bacon during Bacon's Rebellion. Stith was a supporter of Sir William Berkeley. In 1691, Stith was the high sheriff of Charles City County.

Marriage and children
In 1657, Stith married Jane Drury Mosby, the widow of Thomas Gregory and Joseph Parsons, and had five children according to his will:
 John Stith married Mary Randolph, the daughter of William Randolph, and had three children: William, John, and Mary.
 Drury Stith married Susannah Bathurst and had at least two children. He was made a Lieutenant Colonel and died in 1741.
 Anne Stith married Robert Bolling in 1681 and had at least seven children.
 Jane Stith wife of Capt. Daniel Luellin
 Agnes Stith wife of Mr. Thomas Wynn

Death
Stith's final will was proved April 3, 1694. He had been living at Westover Parish, Charles City County, Virginia. His estate was divided between his wife, and sons John and Drury. He left money to his daughters Jane, Ann, and Agnes. Before Stith's death, Drury received his third of the estate, which included land on the eastern branch of Herring Creek. John was to receive the land Stith lived on and a mill.

Notes

References

Year of birth unknown
Year of death unknown
American people of English descent
House of Burgesses members
People from Charles City County, Virginia
First Families of Virginia